Slavo-Serbia or Slaveno-Serbia (/  or  / ; Slavonic-Serbian: Славо-Сербія or Славено-Сербія), was a territory of Imperial Russia from 1753 to 1764. It was located by the right bank of the Donets River between the Bakhmutka River and Luhan River. This area today constitutes the territories of the present-day Luhansk Oblast and Donetsk Oblast of Ukraine. The administrative centre of Slavo-Serbia was Bakhmut (Bahmut).

History

By the decree of the Senate of May 29, 1753, the free lands of this area were offered for settlement to Serbs, Romanians, Bulgarians, Greeks and other Balkan peoples of Orthodox Christian denomination to ensure frontier protection and development of this part of the steppes.

Slavo-Serbia was directly governed by Russia's Governing Senate and College of War. The settlers eventually formed the Bakhmut hussar regiment in 1764. Also in 1764, Slavo-Serbia was transformed into the Donets uyezd of Yekaterinoslav Governorate (now in Dnipropetrovs'ka oblast', Ukraine). Commandants of Slavo-Serbia were Colonels Rajko Depreradović and Jovan Šević. These Serbian colonels led their soldiers in various Russian military campaigns; in peacetime they kept the borderlands, along with the Cossacks, free from incursions by other states.

Demographics
The province had ethnically diverse population that included Serbs, Romanians, and others. In 1755, the population of Slavo-Serbia numbered 1,513 inhabitants (of both genders). In 1756, in the regiment of Jovan Šević, there were 38% Serbs, 23% Romanians, and 22% others.

Places of Slavo-Serbia

See also 
 New Serbia (historical province)
 Jovan Horvat
 Jovan Šević
 Jovan Albanez
 Rajko Depreradović

Notes

References 

Pavel Rudjakov, Seoba Srba u Rusiju u 18. veku, Beograd, 1995.
Olga M. Posunjko, Istorija Nove Srbije i Slavenosrbije, Novi Sad, 2002.

 
Historical regions in Ukraine
Subdivisions of the Russian Empire
History of the Serbs
Romanians in Ukraine
States and territories established in 1753
1764 disestablishments